Faasle is a 1985 Bollywood film produced and directed by Yash Chopra.

The film stars Sunil Dutt, Rekha, Farooq Shaikh, Deepti Naval, Rohan Kapoor, Farah, Raj Kiran, Sushma Seth and Aloknath. The film is the debut film for Rohan Kapoor, son of singer Mahendra Kapoor and also for the actress Farah, niece of Shabana Azmi. The film's music was composed by Shiv-Hari with lyrics by Shahryar. This film was panned by the critics for bad storyline and editing.

Plot
Vikram is proud and wealthy. His wife having died young, Vikram has brought up his son Sanjay and daughter Chandni, sacrificing his own personal happiness, choosing a secret relationship over marriage, with Maya. He dotes upon his children and is very protective about his daughter.

When Vijay comes into Chandni's life and steals her heart - they realize the course of true love never runs smooth and her father's disapproval and her impending arranged marriage threatens the love between Chandni and Vijay.

Faasle is a story about the blind sense of duty inculcated by the older generation and the self-confidence and arrogance of the youth, it is a story of everyone doing what they believe to be right, all in the name of Love.

Cast
Sunil Dutt as Vikram
Rekha as Maya
Farooq Shaikh as Sanjay  
Deepti Naval as Sheetal  
Rohan Kapoor as Vijay
Farah as Chandni  
Raj Kiran as Shivraj Gupta
Daljeet Kaur as Shivraj's Sister-in-law
Ajit Singh Deol as Veer
Damyanti Puri as Veer's wife 
Huma Khan as dancer 
Sushma Seth as Shivraj's Eldest Sister-in-law
Javed Khan as Nandu
Aloknath as Shivraj's Handicapped Brother

Soundtrack
The music were composed by Shiv-Hari and the lyrics were penned by Shahryar.

References

External links
 

1985 films
1980s Hindi-language films
Films directed by Yash Chopra
Films scored by Shiv-Hari
Yash Raj Films films